The Morton A. Brody Distinguished Judicial Service Award is presented annually by Colby College to a United States federal or state judge who embodies the qualities of integrity, compassion, humanity, and judicial craftsmanship. The award is named for Morton A. Brody, and was established in 2001 at the request of the Brody family.  It is conferred biennially, with the exception of 2001 and 2002.

Recipients

References

External links

Colby College
Legal awards
Awards established in 2001
2001 establishments in Maine